Cizhu (Mandarin: 茨竹乡) is a township in Muchuan County, Leshan, Sichuan, China. In 2010, Cizhu Township had a total population of 7,257: 3,835 males and 3,422 females: 1,322 aged under 14, 4,817 aged between 15 and 65 and 1,108 aged over 65.

See also 
 List of township-level divisions of Sichuan

References 

Township-level divisions of Sichuan
Muchuan County